The Spanish Basketball Federation (FEB) is the governing body of basketball in Spain. It is based in Madrid, Spain. It was founded on 31 July 1923 as Federación Española de Basketball in Barcelona, Spain.

It oversees the Spanish top professional basketball league: the Liga ACB, even though it is organized by Asociación de Clubs de Baloncesto (ACB). It organizes the LEB Oro, the LEB Plata and the Liga EBA.

It is also responsible for appointing the management of the men's, women's, and youth national basketball teams. As of 2020, the federation has 3,361 registered clubs and 376,352 federated basketball players, being the second biggest federation after the Football Federation.

Competitions

The FEB also organizes several competitions:
 Men's competitions:
 LEB Oro
 LEB Plata
 Liga EBA
 Copa Princesa de Asturias
 Copa LEB Plata
 Women's competitions:
 Liga Femenina
 Liga Femenina 2
 Copa de la Reina
 Supercopa de España

Honours

Senior National Teams

Men

Women

Youth national teams

Men

Women

All-time participation table 
Combined table of men's and women's basketball teams, both senior and youth teams. 
Not included two discontinued competitions: Men's U-21 World Championship (three participations in four editions) and Women's U-21 World Championship for Women (one participation in two editions). Not included either, Mediterranean Games.

All-time medallists 
Combined table of men's and women's medal winners, with both senior and youth teams, also including medals won in the 3x3 format, as recognized by the Spanish Basketball Federation:
Bold denotes players still playing international basketball.

See also 
Spain national basketball team
Spain women's national basketball team
Spain national youth basketball teams
Spanish basketball league system
List of basketball clubs in Spain

References

External links 
Official website 
Spain at FIBA site

Basketball in Spain
Basketball
Basketball governing bodies in Europe
Sports organizations established in 1923